Brachyogmus is a genus of true weevils in the beetle family Curculionidae. There is at least one described species in Brachyogmus, B. ornatus.

References

Further reading

External links

Curculioninae
Articles created by Qbugbot